The Joker Funhouse Coaster is a Chance Rides steel roller coaster located at Six Flags Over Georgia in Atlanta, Georgia, United States.

The coaster is designed for families and children. It is located in the new kids' themed area, "DC Super Friends", that replaced parts of the former "Bugs Bunny World". In September 2015, the park announced two new kids' areas to replace the former one. Since Wile E. Coyote Canyon Blaster was a part of the old area, it was re-themed in 2016 to fit the area of the DC Comics universe.

References

Roller coasters operated by Six Flags
Roller coasters introduced in 2004
Roller coasters in Georgia (U.S. state)
Steel roller coasters
Six Flags Over Georgia
Joker (character) in other media